—From Robert Frost's "Stopping by Woods on a Snowy Evening", first published this year in his collection New Hampshire
Nationality words link to articles with information on the nation's poetry or literature (for instance, Irish or France).

Events
 In Paris, Basil Bunting meets Ezra Pound, whose poems will have a strong influence on Bunting throughout his career.
 E. C. McFarlane and others found the Jamaican Poetry League.
 Xu Zhimo founds the Crescent Moon Society in China.
 December – Persian poet Nima Yooshij publishes the poem Afsaneh, the manifesto of the She'r-e Nimaa'i school of modernist poetry.

Works published in English

Canada
 Arthur Bourinot, Lyrics from the hills
 Katherine Hale, ed.,Isabella Valancy Crawford
 Thom MacInnes, Complete Poems
 Marjorie Pickthall, Angels' Shoes, posthumously published
 E. J. Pratt, Newfoundland Verse, Canada
 Duncan Campbell Scott, The Witching of Elspie

Indian in English
 Ananda Acharya, Usarika ("Dawn-Rhythms") ( Poetry in English ),
 N. M. Chatterjee, India and Other Sonnets ( Poetry in English ), Calcutta
 Margaret MacNicol, Poems by Indian Women ( Poetry in English ), Calcutta: Association Press, 98 pages; anthology
 Oriental Blossoms, London: Heath Cranton; anthology; Indian poetry in English, published in the United Kingdom
 Puran Singh, Unsung Beads( Poetry in English ) on mystical experiences and with social and political themes
 K. S. Venkataramani, On the Sand-Dune ( Poetry in English ), Madras: Ganesh and Co.
 S. K. De, A history of Sanskrit Poetics, one of the earliest accounts of Sanskrit literary theories in English; scholarship

United Kingdom
 Harold Acton, Aquarium
 Edmund Blunden, To Nature
 W. H. Davies, Collected Poems, second series; first series, 1916, see also Collected Poems, 1928; Poems, 1934
 Walter De La Mare, Come Hither: A Collection of Rhymes and Poems for the Young of all Ages (anthology)
 John Drinkwater, Collected Poems, in three volumes, published 1923–1937
 T. S. Eliot, The Waste Land (1922) first published in the U.K. in book form complete with notes in a limited edition in September 1923 by the Hogarth Press of Richmond upon Thames, run by Eliot's Bloomsbury Group friends Leonard and Virginia Woolf, the type handset by Virginia (completed in July))
 Robert Graves, Whipperginny
 D. H. Lawrence, Birds, Beasts and Flowers, including "Snake", published in the United Kingdom in November; first published in the United States in October; English poet and author living in the United States (1922–1925)
 Hugh MacDiarmid (pen name of Christopher Murray Grieve, the name used for this book), Annals of the Five Senses
 Katherine Mansfield, Poems (posthumous), New Zealand author living in Europe
 John Masefield:
 Collected Poems
 King Cole, and Other Poems
 Alice Meynell, Last Poems (posthumous)
 Susan Miles, Little Mirrors (probable date)
 Herbert Read, Mutations of the Phoenix
 Edith Sitwell, Bucolic Comedies
 Oriental Blossoms, London: Heath Cranton; anthology; Indian poetry in English, published in the United Kingdom
 Osbert Sitwell, Out of the Flame
 Jean Toomer, Cane
 William Butler Yeats, The Cat and the Moon, including "Leda and the Swan", Ireland and United Kingdom

United States
 Conrad Aiken, The Pilgrimage of Festus
 Stephen Vincent Benet:
 King David
 The Ballad of William Sycamore, 1790–1880
 Louise Bogan, Body of This Death
 E.E. Cummings, Tulips and Chimneys
 Djuna Barnes, A Book, collection of prose and poetry
 Robert Frost, New Hampshire including "Stopping by Woods on a Snowy Evening", "Fire and Ice", "Nothing Gold Can Say"
 Elsa Gidlow, On A Grey Thread, the first volume of openly lesbian love poetry published in North America.
 D.H. Lawrence, Birds, Beasts and Flowers, including "Snake", published in the United States in October, published in the United Kingdom in November, English poet and author living in the United States (1922–1925)
 Vachel Lindsay, Going-to-the-Sun
 Edna St. Vincent Millay, The Harp-Weaver and Other Poems
 Lizette Woodworth Reese, Wild Cherry
 Edward Arlington Robinson, Roman Bartholow
 George Sterling, Selected Poems
 Wallace Stevens, Harmonium, including "Thirteen Ways of Looking at a Blackbird", "The Emperor of Ice-Cream", "Le Monocle de Mon Oncle", "Thirteen Ways of Looking at a Blackbird", "Peter Quince at the Clavier", "Sunday Morning", "Sea Surface Full of Clouds", and "In the Clear Season of Grapes". Stevens' first book, it was published by Knopf when he was in middle age (44 years old). Its first edition sold only a hundred copies before being remaindered, suggesting that Mark Van Doren had it right when he wrote in The Nation in 1923, that Stevens's wit "is tentative, perverse, and superfine; and it will never be popular." Yet by 1960 the cottage industry of Stevens studies was becoming a "multinational conglomerate". (Revised edition, 1931.)
 Jean Toomer, Cane, a blend of poetry, fiction and dramatic sketches
 Amos Wilder, Battle Retrospect, Yale University Press (this year's winner of the Yale Series of Younger Poets)
 William Carlos Williams:
 Go Go
 Spring and All

Other in English
 Mina Loy, Lunar Baedecker, English-born poet living and published in Paris
 Shaw Neilson, Ballad and Lyrical Poems, Sydney, Bookfellow, Australia
 W. B. Yeats, The Cat and the Moon, including "Leda and the Swan", Irish poet published in the United Kingdom

Works published in other languages

France
 Antonin Artaud, Tric-trac du ciel, Paris: Galerie Simon
 Jean Cocteau, Plain-Chant
 Francis Jammes:
 La Brebis égarée
 Livres des quatrains, published each year from 1922 to 1925
 Alphonse Métérié, Le Cahier noir
 Tristan Tzara, pen name of Sami Rosenstock, De nos oiseaux

Indian subcontinent
Including all of the British colonies that later became India, Pakistan, Bangladesh, Sri Lanka and Nepal. Listed alphabetically by first name, regardless of surname:

Telugu language
 Bahar-e-Gulshan-e-Kashmir, anthology of traditional Kashmiri poetry, mostly the vatsans and ghazals of Mahmood Gami
 Pendyalu Venkatasubrahmanya Shastri, critical account of the Mahabharata and its interpretation (second edition published in 1933), Telugu-language criticism
 Penumarti Venkataratnam, Sandhya ragamu, romantic poems; a well-known work in the field of Telugu poetry

Other in India
 Seemab Akbarabadi, Naistaan, Urdu
 Bharati, Kuyil Pattu-Kannan Pattu-Parata Arupattaru, consists of three works, including Kuyil Pattu, written in 1912, a long narrative poem of 741 lines, written in the traditional Kalivenpa meter, called "a landmark in the field of modern Tamil poetry" by Sisir Kumar Das; Parati Arupattaru, 66-verse autobiographical work
 Chandra Kanta Agarwala, Binbaragi, 12 important poems about the past glory of Assam, ancient Assamese ballads strongly influenced the poems; Assamese language
 G. Sankara Kurup, Sahitya Kantukam, lyrical Malayalam poems modelled on those of Vallathol Narayana Menon, with original themes, context and diction; the author later published three other volumes with the same title
 Godavarish Mishra, Kisalaya, Oriya-language
 Imam Baksh Nasikh, Divan-i Nasikh, two volumes, Urdu
 Jhaverchand Meghani, Veninan Phool (Gujarati-language)
 Kumaran Asan, Karuna, based on the Buddhist legend of Vasavadatta and Upagupta; the author's last poem and an extremely popular one; celebrates compassion (karuna), Malayalam language
 Mahananda Sapkota, Manalahari, Nepali language
 Manishankar Bhatt "Kant", Purvalap, a work with a conspicuous romantic mood and classical diction, considered a landmark of Gujarati poetry, according to  Sisir Kumar Das; published on the day the poet died
 Nagardas Amarjee Pandya, Rukmini-Harana, epic Sanskrit mahakavya on a mythological theme
 Puran Singh, Khulle Maidan, blank verse, Punjabi language
 Sarasvatibhai Bhide, editor, Abhinavakavyamala, Volume 5, Marathi-language anthology of modern women poets
 Sukumar Ray, Abol Tabol ("literally, "weird and random"),  nonsense verse, Sisir Kumar Das has called it "one of the landmarks in the history of Bengali literature for children"
 Yatindranath Sengupta, Maricika, known for their innovative rhythm and imagery in Bengali poetry, very different from the followers of Rabindranath Tagore

Spain
 Juan Ramón Jiménez:
Belleza ("Beauty")
Poesía ("Poetry")
 Pedro Salinas, Presagios ("Presages")

Other languages
 Otto Gelsted, Reklameskibet ("The Show Boat"), Denmark
 Enrique González Rojo, Sr., El puerto y otros poemas, Mexico
 Sir Muhammad Iqbal, Payam-i-Mashriq (Message from the East), philosophical poetry in Persian
 Vladislav Khodasevich, Heavy Lyre, Russian poet published in Germany
 Hendrik Marsman, Verzen, Netherlands
 Vladimir Mayakovsky, About That, Soviet Russia 
 Pablo Neruda, Crepusculario ("Book of Twilights"), Chile
 Rainer Maria Rilke, Duino Elegies and Sonnets to Orpheus, Austria
 J. Slauerhoff, Archipel ("Archipelago"), Netherlands
 David Vogel, Lifney Hasha'ar Ha'afel ("Before the Dark Gate"), Hebrew language, published in Vienna, the only book of poems published in the author's lifetime

Awards and honors
 Nobel Prize in Literature (International): William Butler Yeats
 Pulitzer Prize for Poetry (United States): Edna St. Vincent Millay, The Ballad of the Harp-Weaver: A Few Figs from Thistles: Eight Sonnets in American Poetry, 1922. A Miscellany
 Georg Büchner Prize (Germany): Adam Karrillon, German physician, novelist and poet

Births
Death years link to the corresponding "[year] in poetry" article:
 January 9 – David Holbrook (died 2011), English poet, novelist and academic
 January 13 – Pinkie Gordon Lane (died 2008), African American poet
 January 15 – Ivor Cutler (died 2006), Scottish poet, songwriter and humorist
 January 16 – Anthony Hecht (died 2004), American poet
 January 23 – John Logan (died 1987), American poet
 February 2 – James Dickey (died 1997), American poet and novelist
 February 4 – Cola Franzen (died 2018), American translator
 February 12 – Alan Dugan (died 2003), American poet
 March 18 – Ryūichi Tamura 田村隆 (died 1998), Japanese Shōwa period poet, essayist and translator of English-language novels and poetry
 March 21 – Nizar Qabbani (died 1998), Syrian diplomat, poet and publisher
 March 27 – Louis Simpson (died 2012), Jamaican-born American poet, winner of the 1964 Pulitzer Prize for Poetry
 March 30 – Milton Acorn (died 1986), Canadian poet, writer and playwright nicknamed "The People's Poet"
 April 3
 Daniel Hoffman (died 2013), American poet, essayist and academic serving as Consultant in Poetry to the Library of Congress (a position later known as Poet Laureate Consultant in Poetry) from 1973 to 1974
 John Ormond (died 1990), Welsh poet and journalist
 May 21 – Dorothy Hewett (died 2002), Australian feminist poet, playwright and novelist
 June 24 – Yves Bonnefoy (died 2002), French poet
 June 29 – Pablo García Baena (died 2018), Spanish poet
 July 2 – Wisława Szymborska (died 2012), Polish poet, essayist and translator, winner of the Nobel Prize in Literature in 1996
 July 16 – Mari Evans (died 2017), African-American poet, author, playwright, academic and television producer
 September 13 – Miroslav Holub (died 1998), Czech poet and immunologist
 September 22 – Dannie Abse (died 2014), Welsh poet and writer
 October 9 – Haim Gouri (died 2018), Israeli poet in Hebrew, novelist and documentary filmmaker
 October 24 – Denise Levertov (died 1997), English-born American poet
 November 9 – James Schuyler (died 1991), American poet and a central figure in the New York School
 November 22 – Tu An (蒋壁厚, Jiǎng Bìhoù; died 2017), Chinese poet and translator
 December 21 – Richard Hugo, born Richard Hogan (died 1982), American poet
 December 20 – Aco Šopov (died 1982) Macedonian poet
 Also – Nanao Sakaki (died 2008), Japanese poet and leading personality of "The Tribe" (Buzoko), a counter-cultural group (surname: Sakaki)

Deaths
Birth years link to the corresponding "[year] in poetry" article:
 January 9 – Katherine Mansfield, 34 (born 1888), New Zealand-born poet and prominent Modernist writer of short fiction
 May – J. Brynach Davies (Brynach), c.50 (born 1873), Welsh poet and journalist
 June 15 – Maurice Hewlett, 62 (born 1861), English historical novelist, poet and essayist
 August 10 – Laura Redden Searing, 84 (born 1839), deaf American poet and journalist
 September 10 – Sukumar Ray, 35 (born 1887), Bengali humorous poet, short-story writer and playwright
 October 12 – John Cadvan Davies (Cadfan), 77 (born 1846), Welsh poet and hymn-writer
 December 15 – Frank Morton, 53 (born 1869), English-born Australian poet and journalist
 December 18 – Edna Dean Proctor, 94 (born 1829), American poet; occasional author of short sketches and stories

See also

 Poetry
 List of poetry awards
 List of years in poetry
 New Objectivity in German literature and art

Notes

Poetry
20th-century poetry